The Bashkirian is in the ICS geologic timescale the lowest stage or oldest age of the Pennsylvanian.

The Bashkirian overlaps with the upper part of the Namurian and lower part of the Westphalian stages from regional European stratigraphy. It also overlaps with the North American Morrowan and Atokan stages and the Chinese Luosuan and lower Huashibanian stages.

Name and definition
The Bashkirian was named after Bashkiria, the then Russian name of the republic of Bashkortostan in the southern Ural Mountains of Russia, home of the Bashkir people. The stage was introduced by Russian stratigrapher Sofia Semikhatova in 1934.

The base of the Bashkirian is at the first appearance of conodont species Declinognathodus noduliferus. The top of the stage (the base of the Moscovian) is at the first appearance of the conodonts Declinognathodus donetzianus or Idiognathoides postsulcatus, or at the first appearance of fusulinid Aljutovella aljutovica. The GSSP (type location for the base of a stage) for the Bashkirian is in the Battleship Wash Formation at Arrow Canyon, Nevada.

Subdivision
The Bashkirian contains six biozones based on conodont index fossils:
 Neognathodus atokaensis Zone
 Declinognathodus marginodosus Zone
 Idiognathodus sinuosus Zone
 Neognathodus askynensis Zone
 Idiognathoides sinuatus Zone
 Declinognathodus noduliferus Zone

References

Literature
; 2006: Global time scale and regional stratigraphic reference scales of Central and West Europe, East Europe, Tethys, South China, and North America as used in the Devonian–Carboniferous–Permian Correlation Chart 2003 (DCP 2003), Palaeogeography, Palaeoclimatology, Palaeoecology 240(1-2): pp 318–372.

External links
Carboniferous timescale at the website of the Norwegian network of offshore records of geology and stratigraphy
Bashkirian, Geowhen Database

 
Pennsylvanian geochronology